Zodintluanga Ralte  is politician from Mizoram and resides at Tuikual, Aizawl. He is currently the Treasurer of Mizoram Pradesh Congress Committee and the Leader of Congress Legislature party in the Mizoram Legislative Assembly.

Career
He has served in various capacities in Mizoram Pradesh Congress Committee as Executive Member, General Secretary and President of the youth wing before taking over as treasurer of MPCC. He has been elected as MLA of Thorang Constituency. He has been well known for introducing astro turf in Lammual and Rajiv Gandhi Stadium, Aizawl and various parts of the state including Lunglei, Kolasib and Champhai.

References

Mizoram politicians
People from Lunglei district
Living people
Mizo people
1962 births
Mizoram MLAs 2018–2023